The Mannheim–Stuttgart high-speed railway is a  long railway line in Germany, connecting the cities of Mannheim and Stuttgart. The line was officially opened on 9 May 1991, and InterCityExpress service began on 2 June. The Hanover–Würzburg high-speed railway also opened at the same time. The line cost about DM 4.5 billion to build and has 15 tunnels and more than 90 bridges.

Planning

Planning for a new line between Mannheim and Stuttgart (the two largest cities of Baden-Württemberg) began in 1970. The railway lines that it replaced followed the terrain and followed rivers and valleys, resulting in steep gradients and sharp curves and thus not suitable for high-speed trains. The 1973 federal transport plan incorporated the following minimum requirements for mixed traffic to accommodate heavy, slow goods trains and light fast passenger trains:
maximum grade of 1.25% (occasionally 2.0%) 
curves with small superelevation and minimum radii of 
maximum line speed of 
average construction costs of 30 to 50 million DM per kilometre 
point-to-point connections between two railway junctions.

To fulfill these requirements, it was necessary to build a large number of structures such as bridges and tunnels.

In addition, a new technology had to be pursued: the Forst Tunnel is under the water table for its entire length and required a new water-diverting technology. The Freudenstein Tunnel is through the porous rock strata, which flows as a result of heavy rains on the hillsides above it. That geological feature required expensive safeguards, which were used for the first time.

A first planning statement for the Mannheim-Stuttgart route was published in 1974. The Federal Ministry of Transport issued the building permit in 1975, and construction commenced in 1976. More than 6,000 objections led to some route changes during the construction. The construction of some sections was at times completely halted. In seven places the protests of the nearby residents led to the building of cut and cover tunnels. The longest tunnel of this kind was the Pfingstberg tunnel, which leads through a forest, a declared water protection zone, near Mannheim-Rheinau.

Cross-overs were provided for the planned operations mixing passenger and goods trains and for maintenance operations every five to seven kilometres. Planning for the entire route was not resolved until 1985.

Construction
The first section was completed on 31 May 1987 between the junction with the Rhine Railway in Mannheim and Graben-Neudorf. The last section to be completed was the second tube of the Freudenstein Tunnel, which was completed a few months before the opening of the entire line. The commercial service commenced in 1991.

Before the commencement of passenger operations two thousand training runs were undertaken to familiarise drivers with the technical characteristics of driving on high-speed lines, such as in-cab signalling and preventing the application of the emergency brakes.

Operations

The Mannheim-Stuttgart line was opened for commercial operations on 9 May 1991, and the first ICE operation on this route started on 2 June. The maximum speed was initially  with  permitted to overcome delays. The maximum speed is currently  regardless of delays or not. The opening of the line reduced the travel time from Mannheim to Stuttgart from 90 to 44 minutes in 1991. By 2007, the travel time was reduced further to 35–38 minutes.

Since its opening, the various ICE lines have been operating on this route:
line 11: Berlin Ostbf, Berlin Hbf, Berlin-Spandau, Braunschweig, Kassel Wilhelmshöhe, Fulda, Frankfurt/Main, Mannheim, Stuttgart, Ulm, Augsburg and München (departing every two hours each way)
line 22: Hamburg, Hanover, Göttingen, Kassel-Wilhelmshöhe, Fulda, Frankfurt, Mannheim, Stuttgart, (departing every two hours, each way)
line 42: Amsterdam/Dortmund, Duisburg, Düsseldorf, Köln Hbf, Frankfurt Airport – Mannheim Hbf, Stuttgart, Ulm, Augsburg and München (departing every two hours, each way)
The trains travelling between Heidelberg and Karlsruhe (including TGVs) also use the northern section of this route, which connects at Rollenberg Junction.

While the cross-overs were installed every  to allow the goods trains operating on the same line and at the same time as the passenger train, they were relegated to operating at night while the passenger trains were not operating.

Notes

References
Joachim Seyferth: Die Neubaustrecken der Deutschen Bundesbahn. Wiesbaden 1983 
Ernst Rudolph: Eisenbahn auf neuen Wegen: Hannover–Würzburg, Mannheim–Stuttgart. Darmstadt 1989,  
Berndt von Mitzlaff, Ralf Roman Rossberg: Jahrbuch des Eisenbahnwesens 42: Hochgeschwindigkeitsverkehr. Darmstadt 1991,  
Bundesbahndirektion Karlsruhe: Streckenkarte Neubaustrecke Mannheim–Stuttgart 1:100.000. Karlsruhe 1990 
Neue Bahnhöfe an der Neubaustrecke Stuttgart-Mannheim in db. 11/1988. Stuttgart 1988

See also 
 High-speed rail in Germany

Railway lines in Baden-Württemberg
High-speed railway lines in Germany